Poshteh-ye Gish (also Romanized as Poshteh-ye Gīsh) is a village in Berentin Rural District, Bikah District, Rudan County, Hormozgan Province, Iran. At the 2006 census, its population was 162, in 34 families.

References 

Populated places in Rudan County